The Little Wanganui River is a river of the West Coast Region of New Zealand's South Island. It flows generally west from the slopes of Mount Allen, reaching the Karamea Bight close to the small settlement of Little Wanganui. It is home to a large number of trout.

See also
List of rivers of New Zealand

References

Rivers of the West Coast, New Zealand
Buller District
Rivers of New Zealand